Great Yeldham is a village in north Essex, England, about  from the Suffolk border. Great Yeldham is situated along the busy main A1017 road (formerly A604) between Braintree and Haverhill.

The village is where the infant River Colne is joined by a stream from near Stambourne and another that has flowed via Toppesfield.  The river flows via Colchester on its 39-mile journey to the sea.

Great Yeldham contains the "Great Oak", an old preserved oak tree in the centre of the village, which is claimed to have been recorded in William the Conqueror's Domesday Book of 1086.

In 1967 Great Yeldham elected a Communist councillor, June Cohen, to the surprise of many in the area.

Agriculture
From the 1950s to the 1970s Great Yelham was home to the Whitlock Bros, manufacturers and exporters of Dinkum Diggers (tractors with backhoes and fronthoes, often known these days as 'JCB's).  In 1972 Whitlock Bros. was taken over by Hymac, and production subsequently moved to Rhymney in Wales.  The Great Yeldham plant closed, resulting in many job losses.

The land around Great Yeldham is principally used for arable farming and some livestock rearing.  From the early 1950s until the mid-1980s Great Yeldham was also known for its apple and strawberry farm called Lark Hill Farm, to which people came from miles around to pick their own fruit.

Transport
Until 1962 it was served for passenger traffic by Yeldham railway station on the Colne Valley and Halstead Railway line between Chappel and Wakes Colne and Haverhill.  The line crossed what was called Station Road at a level crossing.  The road has since been renamed 'Toppesfield Road'.

References

External links

St. Andrew's Primary School (Great Yeldham) Website
Website for St. Andrew’s Church, Great Yeldham, part of the Upper Colne Valley Parishes

Villages in Essex
Braintree District